Speed Memorial Live “One More Dream” + Remix was Japanese J-pop girlband, Speed's collection of live songs recorded during their live one-night only concert in 2001, One More Dream. This album was released on December 19, 2001.

Track listing
 Opening
 All My True Love
 Steady
 Wake Me Up !
 Alive
 Carry On My Way
 White Love
 Body & Soul
 Go! Go!  Heaven
 One More Dream
 
 My Graduation

[Remix]

 All My True Love (Za Downtown Weekend Mix)
 Stead (Za Downtown Smoove Mix)
 White Love (Gospel Mix)

Speed (Japanese band) albums
2001 live albums
2001 remix albums